Jagtial Assembly constituency is a constituency of Telangana Legislative Assembly, India. It is one among 3 constituencies in Jagtial district. It is part of Nizamabad Lok Sabha constituency.

M. Sanjay Kumar of Telangana Rashtra Samithi won from the constituency for the time in 2018 Legislative Assembly Election.

Mandals
The Assembly Constituency presently comprises the following Mandals:

Members of Legislative Assembly

Election results

Telangana Legislative Assembly election, 2018

Telangana Legislative Assembly election, 2014

See also
 List of constituencies of Telangana Legislative Assembly

References

Assembly constituencies of Telangana
Jagtial district